Mirahjin (also Romanized as Mīrahjīn; also known as Mīrājīn) is a village in Khvoresh Rostam-e Shomali Rural District, Khvoresh Rostam District, Khalkhal County, Ardabil Province, Iran. At the 2006 census, its population was 176, in 44 families.

References 

Tageo

Towns and villages in Khalkhal County